Avindin (also Romanized as Avīndīn; also known as Avendīn) is a village in Harzandat-e Sharqi Rural District, in the Central District of Marand County, East Azerbaijan Province, Iran. At the 2006 census, its population was 308, in 89 families.

References 

Populated places in Marand County